"Oh Yes" is the third single by rapper Juelz Santana from his second studio album What the Game's Been Missing!.

The song samples The Carpenters' cover version of the song "Please Mr. Postman", originally performed by The Marvelettes.

Charts

Weekly charts

Year-end charts

References

2005 songs
Juelz Santana songs
Def Jam Recordings singles
Songs written by Juelz Santana
2006 singles